Netherlands–South Africa refers to the current and historical relations between the Netherlands and South Africa. Both nations share historic ties and have a long-standing special relationship, partly due to the Dutch colony in the Cape, linguistic similarity between Dutch and Afrikaans and the Netherlands’ staunch support in the struggle against Apartheid.

History

Dutch colonization

In 1652, the Dutch East India Company decided to establish a colony in the Cape of Good Hope (in present-day Cape Town) to use as a base for Dutch trade with Asia, particularly with its colony in Indonesia. A few years after the Dutch arrival to the Cape, the Khoikhoi–Dutch Wars began in 1659 and lasted until 1677. After the wars, the Dutch began further expansion inland. Soon afterwards, Dutch farmers known as Boers (Dutch for farmer) began arriving to the Cape region to settle and would become the forefathers of the Afrikaner people.

In 1795, the Dutch Cape Colony became a British colony after the Battle of Muizenberg. The British decided to take the Cape Colony after the Netherlands became part of the French Empire under Napoléon Bonaparte after France annexed the Netherlands. In 1802, the British returned the Cape Colony to the Dutch after the signing of the Treaty of Amiens, however, in 1806, during the Napoleonic Wars, a second British invasion re-occupied the colony after the Battle of Blaauwberg and it remained a British colony. In 1814 the Dutch government formally ceded sovereignty over the Cape to the British, under the terms of the Convention of London.

Relations during Apartheid
In 1931, South Africa became an independent nation after the passing of the Statute of Westminster. In 1938, the Netherlands and South Africa officially established diplomatic relations. During World War II (1939-1945) both nations fought as allies.

In 1948, the South African government, at the time representing only a small proportion of the population, erected a system of strict racial segregation and called it apartheid (separateness) which is a codified system of racial stratification which first began to take form in South Africa under the Dutch Empire in the late eighteenth century. Initially, the Dutch government was neutral to the apartheid government in South Africa. South Africa was one of only a handful of United Nations member states to support the Dutch view that the issues the Netherlands faced concerning the decolonization of Indonesia and the Netherlands New Guinea were of a 'domestic' nature and that the UN had no right to interfere. In 1949, during the visit of South African Prime Minister Daniel François Malan to the Netherlands, Dutch Queen Juliana told her guest that she would "never set foot in his country as long as apartheid reigned". In 1959 the Dutch representative to the UN abstained from voting for an anti-apartheid resolution, apartheid being regarded "an internal affair" of South Africa.

In March 1960, relations between the Netherlands and South Africa became tense after the Sharpeville massacre when South African police shot and killed 69 people. In 1961, the Netherlands was the only Western country to vote in favor of an anti-apartheid resolution in the UN. Soon, Dutch anti-apartheid movements called the "Anti-Apartheid Beweging Nederland" (AABN), and "Kommittee Zuidelijk Afrika" (KZA) (both later merged and converted themselves into the "Nederlands Instituut voor Zuidelijk Afrika" (NIZA)) began staging demonstrations and obtaining signatures to protest against the South African government in the Netherlands. Further events in South Africa led the Dutch government to take more drastic measures such as requesting that all Dutch companies stop dealing with South Africa (however, Shell continued to operate in South Africa). In 1983, the Dutch government imposed visa requirements to South African nationals visiting the Netherlands.

In February 1990, Nelson Mandela was released from prison after serving 27 years. In June 1990, Nelson Mandela paid his first visit to the Netherlands. In October 1990, South African President F. W. de Klerk paid a visit to the Netherlands. Apartheid legislation was abolished in mid-1991 and on 27 April 1994, South Africa held its first fully democratic election and Nelson Mandela was elected as President.

Current relations
In September 1996, Dutch Queen Beatrix paid an official visit to South Africa and met with President Mandela. In 1999, President Mandela paid an official visit to the Netherlands. Both nations maintain cordial relations and work together in international organizations and have signed numerous bilateral agreements in political, economic, cultural and social cooperation. There are direct flights between both nations via KLM.

High-level visits
High-level visits from the Netherlands to South Africa

 Prime Minister Willem Drees (1953)
 Prince Bernhard of Lippe-Biesterfeld (1954)
 Queen Beatrix of the Netherlands (1996)
 Prime Minister Jan Peter Balkenende (2010)
 Crown Prince Willem-Alexander of the Netherlands (2010)
 Prime Minister Mark Rutte (2016)

High-level visits from South Africa to the Netherlands

 Prime Minister Jan Smuts (1946)
 Prime Minister Daniel François Malan (1949)
 President F. W. de Klerk (1990)
 President Nelson Mandela (1999)
 President Thabo Mbeki (2004)

Trade
In 2016, trade between the Netherlands and South Africa totaled 2.9 billion Euros. Dutch exports to South Africa include: chemical based products, petroleum based products, machinery and gemstones. South African exports to the Netherlands include: livestock, meat, fish, fruit, juice and raw material. Dutch multinational companies such as Heineken International, Philips, and Royal Dutch Shell operate in South Africa. South African multinational company, Ceres Fruit Juices, operates in the Netherlands.

Diplomatic missions
 Netherlands has an embassy in Pretoria and a consulate-general in Cape Town.
 South Africa has an embassy in The Hague.

See also
 Afrikaners
 Boer
 Cape Dutch
 Dutch Empire
 South Africa–European Union relations

References 

 
South Africa
Bilateral relations of South Africa
Relations of colonizer and former colony